Highway 687 is a highway in the Canadian province of Saskatchewan. It runs from Highway 16 near Denholm to Highway 378.

Highway 687 also connects with Highway 40.

See also 
Roads in Saskatchewan
Transport in Saskatchewan

References 

687